Podospora macrodecipiens is a species of coprophilous fungus in the family Podosporaceae. It was discovered in Antiparos in Greece, where it was found growing on sheep dung.

References

External links

Fungi described in 2008
Fungi of Greece
Sordariales